Oxford City Nomads Football Club was a football club based in Oxford, England.

History
The club was established in 1936 as Quarry Nomads, a youth team with pupils from the local Quarry School. The team became a men's team after the Second World War when they became part of the Oxford City Football Association. The club played in the Oxford leagues until the 1984–85 season, where having struggled for almost a decade the club stopped playing football for two years. They reformed in the 1987–88 season under the guidance of Keith Dolton, a former player who had been a member of the 1966 Oxfordshire Senior Cup winning side; that season the club entered the Oxford City F.A. Junior League. After winning the Oxfordshire Senior League Premier Division Championship in the 1993–94 season, the club was promoted to the Chiltonian League. After the 2000–01 season the club joined the Hellenic league. The club in 2005 changed its name to the Oxford Quarry Nomads, but one year later they changed their name again for the 2006–07 season to the Oxford City Nomads.

Ground
After being renamed Oxford City Nomads, the club played at Oxford City's Court Place Farm ground. Previously they played at Margaret Road except in the 1990–91 season, when they moved to Risinghurst Cricket Club.

Honours
Hellenic League
Premier Division champions 2011–12
Division One East champions 2002–03
Challenge Cup winners 2012–13
Oxfordshire Senior League
Premier Division champions 1962–63, 1993–94
Oxfordshire Senior Cup
Winners 1965–66

Records
Best FA Vase performance: Second qualifying round 2017–18

See also 
Oxford City Nomads F.C. players

References

External links

Defunct football clubs in England
Sport in Oxford
Defunct football clubs in Oxfordshire
Organisations based in Oxford
Association football clubs established in 1936
1936 establishments in England
Oxfordshire Senior Football League
Chiltonian League
Hellenic Football League
Association football clubs disestablished in 2018
2018 disestablishments in England